Tarsus Zoo (Tarsus Hayvanat Bahçesi) is a zoo in Tarsus ilçe (district) of Mersin Province, Turkey.

Location
In 1999 a small zoo in midtown Tarsus with only a few small animals was established by the municipality of Tarsus. But its area was small and Haytap, the animal-rights-activists forced the municipality to move the zoo to a more convenient area. According to Haytap the former zoo was an animal prison rather than a zoo. The current zoo was opened on 27 December 2013. It is to the south of Berdan Dam reservoir and the picnic area. Its gate is located under the viaduct of Turkish motorway . Its distance to Mersin is about .T

Species
There are currently 81 species, zebra being the last to enter the zoo. According to an announcement an elephant and a giraffe will soon arrive in the zoo.

Although the zoo is classified in category B, the zoo administration decided to apply for the A category.

Admission fee
The zoo is open from 9 AM to 5 PM (6 PM in summers) The admission fee is TL 8.

References

Tourist attractions in Mersin Province
Zoos established in 2013
Zoos in Turkey
2013 establishments in Turkey